J Son, J'Son, Json, or variations may refer to:

People
 J'Son (singer) (born 1980), R&B singer
 Json (rapper) (born 1981), American Christian hip-hop musician
 J-Son (born 1985), Brazilian-born Swedish rapper and songwriter
 DJ Jam Master J'Son (1986), American musician, music producer, and disc jockey

Other uses
 JSON (JavaScript Object Notation), a lightweight computer data interchange format
 J'Son, a Marvel Comics character

See also

 J'Sun, American singer and contestant on season 4 of The Voice (U.S.)
 Jason (disambiguation)
 
 
 
 
 Son (disambiguation)
 J (disambiguation)